Britannia Illustrata, also known as Views of Several of the Queens Palaces and also of the Principal Seats of the Nobility & Gentry of Great Britain is a 170709 map plate folio of parts of Great Britain, arguably the most important work of Dutch draughtsman Jan Kip, who collaborated with Leonard Knijff. The folio consisted of a range of large, detailed folded colored and black and white drawings which today provides a valuable insight into land and buildings at country estates at the time.

The volume is among the most important English topographical publications of the 18th century. Architecture is rendered with care, and the settings of parterres and radiating avenues driven through woods or planted across fields, garden paths gates and toolsheds are illustrated in detail, and staffed with figures and horses, coaches pulling into forecourts, water-craft on rivers, in line with the traditions of the Low Countries. Some of the plates are in the Siennese "map perspective". At Althorp in Northamptonshire, the map revealed in detail the changes to the gardens by André Le Nôtre from earlier maps and depictions.  Kip updated the plates in the 1720s.

References

External links

Illustrations at Google Images

1707 works
Maps of England
Maps of the United Kingdom
Topography
Country houses in England
18th-century maps and globes